Direction des services postaux de l'Office National des Postes et de l'Épargne (ONPE) is the government organization responsible for the postal service in the Central African Republic.

See also
Communications in Central African Republic

Central
Postal system of the Central African Republic
Government of the Central African Republic